Trash Kit is a British post-punk trio formed in 2008 in London. Its members are Rachel Aggs (guitar and vocals), Gill Partington (bass guitar), and Rachel Horwood (drums and vocals).

Original bassist Ros Murray was previously of the band Electrelane. Rachel Aggs also plays in Sacred Paws and Shopping, and Rachel Horwood in Bamboo and Bas Jan (the latter also featuring Serafina Steer). Gill Partington and Rachel Horwood also played together in Halo Halo.

They have been compared to UK punk and post punk acts like The Slits, the Raincoats, and the Au Pairs, as well as noting the West African highlife influence on Aggs' guitar lines. Trash Kit themselves listed early influences as Y Pants, Ikue Mori of DNA, and Marnie Stern.

History
Rachel Aggs and Rachel Horwood met and became friends at university and had been in a couple of bands together prior to forming Trash Kit, inspired by post punk, African percussion, and street performers who drum on trash cans. They met Ros Murray at the Here shop in Bristol.

Upset The Rhythm asked them to record for their label immediately after seeing them play for the first time at the 'Yes Way' festival UTR had put on. They released a 7" single, and their first album for the label - entitled Trash Kit - both in 2010.

After their debut release the band's members spent time playing with other bands. Aggs with Golden Grrrls, Sacred Paws, and Shopping. Horwood with Bamboo and Halo Halo.

Their second album Confidence was released in 2014 again to critical acclaim. It featured the addition of Murray's former Electrelane bandmate Verity Susman playing free jazz-inspired saxophone.

In May 2017, Thurston Moore highlighted them as a band one should know about in an article on the NME's website.

Horwood's Halo Halo bandmate Gill Partington took over bass duties from Murray, and in May 2019 they announced their first album in 5 years, Horizon, would be released 5 July that year.

Discography

Albums
 Trash Kit - Upset The Rhythm, 12" LP, CD, MP3 (2010)
 Confidence - Upset The Rhythm, 12" LP, CD, MP3 (2014)
 Horizon - Upset The Rhythm, 12" LP, CD, MP3 (2019)

Singles
 Teenagers / How Do You Do? - Upset The Rhythm, 7" single, MP3 (2010)

Split releases
 Split with Woolf - Mïlk Records, 7" single, MP3 (2010)

References

Underground punk scene in the United Kingdom
Post-punk revival music groups
Musical groups from London
Musical groups established in 2008
British musical trios